The 2020 Campeonato Paraense was the 108th edition of Pará's top professional football league. The competition started on 22 January and ended on 6 September. Paysandu won the championship for the 48th time.

On 19 March 2020, the governor of Pará and the FPF suspended the Campeonato Paraense indefinitely due to the coronavirus pandemic in Brazil.

Format
The champion and the best placed team not qualified via CBF ranking qualify to the 2021 Copa Verde. The champion, the runner-up and the 3rd-placed team qualify to the 2021 Copa do Brasil. The best two teams who isn't on Campeonato Brasileiro Série A, Série B or Série C qualifies to 2021 Campeonato Brasileiro Série D.

Participating teams

Group stage

Final stage

Semi-finals

Paysandu won 4–3 on aggregate and advanced to the finals.

Remo won 3–0 on aggregate and advanced to the finals.

Finals

Notes

References

Pará
Campeonato Paraense
Campeonato Paraense